Adireksarn is a surname. Notable people with the surname include:

Pongpol Adireksarn (born 1942), Thai novelist and politician
Pramarn Adireksarn (1913–2010), Thai general and politician, father of Pongpol

Thai-language surnames